The Kester Planing Mill, located at the southwest corner of 4th and O Streets in Neligh, in Antelope County, Nebraska was built in 1911–12.  Also known as the Neligh Planing Mill, it was listed on the National Register of Historic Places in 2014.

The planing mill was operated by four generations of the Kester family, until 2002.

References

External links

Industrial buildings and structures on the National Register of Historic Places in Nebraska
Buildings and structures completed in 1912
National Register of Historic Places in Antelope County, Nebraska